Milton Ross Plum (born January 20, 1935) is a former American football quarterback who played for the Cleveland Browns (1957–61), Detroit Lions (1962–67), Los Angeles Rams (1968) and New York Giants (1969) of the National Football League (NFL).

Professional career
Plum played quarterback, defensive back, punter and placekicker at Penn State following his prep years playing for Woodbury High School. After using their first-round pick in the 1957 NFL Draft on Jim Brown, the Browns chose Plum in the second round.

Plum got onto the field at quarterback in the fourth game of the 1957 season when starter Tommy O'Connell got hurt against the Philadelphia Eagles. Plum and O'Connell split time throughout the rest of the 1957 season, in which the Browns went 9-2-1 and won the Eastern Conference.

O'Connell left the NFL after the 1957 season, and over the next four years, Plum was a consistent part of an offense built around the running of Jim Brown and Bobby Mitchell.

Plum's passer rating of 110.4 in 1960 season was the best single-season mark until 1989 when San Francisco quarterback Joe Montana surpassed it with a rating of 112.4. For his five seasons with Cleveland combined, Plum had a rating of 89.9, ranking him first among Browns quarterbacks with at least 750 pass attempts.

In 1960 and 1961, Plum's backup was Len Dawson, who went on to have a Hall of Fame career with the Kansas City Chiefs of the American Football League.

The Browns traded Plum to the Lions as part of a six-player deal before the 1962 season. The Lions lacked the powerful running game of the Browns, forcing Plum to rely more often on his arm. Although he started strong, leading to the Lions to a 3-0 start, things went downhill after a costly interception in Week 4 led to a loss to the Green Bay Packers. Late in the season, head coach George Wilson benched Plum several times in favor of Earl Morrall. The Lions finished 11-3, two games behind Green Bay.

Plum lost the starting-quarterback job to Morrall in 1963, but regained it when Morrall got hurt early in the 1964 season. 1964 wound up being Plum's best year in Detroit; he threw for 2,241 yards and 18 touchdowns, and the Lions finished 7-5-2. The Lions traded Morrall to the Giants before the 1965 season, and Plum struggled that year, completing fewer than half of his passes. In 1966, Plum suffered a knee injury and was replaced by Karl Sweetan, who shared time with Plum in 1967.

Plum backed up Roman Gabriel on the 1968 Rams and Fran Tarkenton and Gary Wood on the 1969 Giants, playing sparingly both years. He retired after the 1969 season and moved to Raleigh, North Carolina.

Plum went 7-2-1 in starting season openers as quarterback for a .778 winning percentage, the second highest for a quarterback since 1950.  He also holds the NFL record for longest completed pass to himself (20 yards).

References

1935 births
Living people
American football quarterbacks
Cleveland Browns players
Detroit Lions players
Los Angeles Rams players
New York Giants players
Penn State Nittany Lions football players
Eastern Conference Pro Bowl players
People from Westville, New Jersey
Players of American football from New Jersey
Sportspeople from Gloucester County, New Jersey
Woodbury Junior-Senior High School alumni